The 2004–05 Regional One-Day Competition was the 31st edition of the Regional Super50, the domestic limited-overs cricket competition for the countries of the West Indies Cricket Board (WICB). The naming rights sponsor for the previous seven seasons, Red Stripe, did not renew their contract, and, in lieu of a replacement, the competition was unbranded for the first time in its history.

For the first time since the 1995–96 season, the competition did not feature any invitational teams, with only the six regular teams of West Indian cricket competing (Barbados, Guyana, Jamaica, the Leeward Islands, Trinidad and Tobago, and the Windward Islands). The round-robin stage was played in Guyana, with the semi-finals and final all played in Barbados. The round-robin was marked by its evenness, with the top four teams all finishing with three wins and two losses. Trinidad and Tobago eventually defeated Guyana in the final to win their seventh domestic one-day title. Leeward Islands batsman Runako Morton led the tournament in runs, while Trinidad and Tobago's Imran Jan took the most wickets.

Squads

Round-robin stage

Finals

Semi-finals

Final

Statistics

Most runs
The top five run scorers (total runs) are included in this table.

Source: CricketArchive

Most wickets

The top five wicket takers are listed in this table, listed by wickets taken and then by bowling average.

Source: CricketArchive

References

2005 in West Indian cricket
2004–05 West Indian cricket season
Regional Super50 seasons
Domestic cricket competitions in 2004–05